This is a list of buildings that are examples of Art Deco in Africa:

Algeria 
 Ahmed Zabana National Museum, Oran
 Cinema Tamgout, Algiers, 1939
 , Algeria, 1922
 Head Office of General Union of Algerian Workers (Union Générale des Travailleurs Algériens), Algiers, 1935
 L'hôpital Baudens, Oran, 1937
 National Museum of Fine Arts (Muséé National des Beaux Arts), Algiers, 1930
 Safir Ex Aletti Hotel, Algiers, 1930

Angola 
source:
 California Building, Lobito
 , Tômbwa
 Cine Gimno Desportivo, Huambo
 Cine Moçâmedes, Namibe
 Cine Sporting, Sumbe
 Cine Teatro Arco Iris, Lubango
 Cine Teatro Impérium, Lobito, 1950s
 Cine Teatro Namibe, Namibe
 Cine Tropical, Luanda, 1950s
 Cinema Ruacaná, Huambo
 Cinema Silva Porto, Cuito
 Correios (Post office building), Lobito
 Grande Hotel da Huila, Lubango, 1930s
 , Kuito
 Tamariz Casino, Lobito
 Victoria Atletico Clube do Bie, Kuito

Burundi 
 , Bujumbura
 Cinema Cine Cameo, Bujumbura, 1922
 Hospital Rural, Ruyigi
 Hotel Paguidas, Bujumbura
 Leo telecom building, Bujumbura
 Restaurant Tanganyika, Bujumbura, 1930s

Cape Verde 
 Banco Comercial do Atlântico, Praia, Santiago
 Câmara Municipal de Santa Catarina, Assomada, Santiago
 Cineclube, Assomada, Santiago
 Cinema de Praia, Praia, Santiago
 Eden Park, Mindelo, São Vicente, 1922
 Electra Power Station, Praia, Santiago
 Hotel Avenida, Assomada, Santiago

Central African Republic 
 Grand Cafe, Bangui City
 Hotel de Ville - City Hall, Bangui City, 1947

Democratic Republic of the Congo (former Zaīre) 
source:

 Avenue du Commerce district, Kinshasa
 Cardinal Malula Stadium (Stade Reine Astrid), Kinshasa, 1937
 Central Railway Station, Lubumbashi
 Cinema Central, Kinshasa, 1930s
 Clinique Reine Elisabeth, Kinshasa, 1932
 Collège des Hautes études de stratégie et de défense (formerly the Force Publique Depot), Kinshasa
 Compagnie Industrielle Africaine, Kinshasa, 1928
 Cotex compound, Kinshasa
 Forescom Building, Kinshasa, 1946
 Grand Hotel, Lubumbashi
 Hotel Astoria (now National Institute of Arts, Kinshasa (l'Institut National des Arts), Kinshasa, 1940s
 Hotel Residence (now branch office of SNEL), Kinshasa, 1940s
 Lycée Bosangani and College Boboto (Lycée Sacre Coeur), Kinshasa, 1940s
 Mairie de Bukavu (Town Hall), Bukavu
 Palace of Justice, Lubumbashi
 Park Hotel, Lubumbashi, 1929
 Sabena Guest House, Kinshasa, 1937
 Sts. Peter and Paul Cathedral (Cathédrale Saints Pierre et Paul de Lubumbashi), Lubumbashi, 1920, 1959
 Tony & Tony Mezepolis restaurant, Lubumbashi

Djibouti 
 Odeon Cinema, Djibouti

Egypt 
 Cinema Amir, Alexandria, 1950
 Metro Cinema, Alexandria, 1949
 Odeon Cinema, Alexandria
 Oreco Building, Alexandria, late 1940s

Cairo 
source:
 Ades Building, Cairo
 Al Bergas 5, Garden City, Cairo
 Cairo Palace Cinema, Cairo, 1945
 Cinema Metro, Cairo, 1939
 Cinema Miami, Cairo, 1949
 Cinema Odeon, 1940s
 Cinema Rivoli, Cairo, 1949
 Cinema Wahba, Cairo
 Diana Palace Cinema, Cairo, 1930
 Foad Serag al Dien, Garden City, Cairo, 1925
 Gobran Apartment Building, Garden City, Cairo, 1929
 Grand Hotel, Cairo
 Hotel Carlton, Cairo, 1935
 Maqha Groppi pastry shop, Cairo, 1925
 Nile House, Cairo
 Rabbat Buildings, Cairo, 1929
 Radio Cinema, Cairo, 1948
 Sabet Building, Corniche El-Nil
 Al-Tahrir Cinema, Giza, Cairo, 1950s
 Yacoubian Building (Cairo), 1937

Eritrea

Asmara 
source:
 Alfa Romeo apartments, Asmara, 1937
 Asmara Silicon Factory, Asmara
 Asmara Town Hall, Asmara
 Bar Zilli, Asmara, 1939
 The Bristol Pension Hotel, Asmara, 1940s
 British American Tobacco Company Group Offices, Asmara, 1938
 Central Region Administration Building, Asmara
 Cinema Capitol, Asmara, 1941, 1944
 Cinema Dante, Asmara, 1910
 Cinema Impero, Asmara, 1937
 Cinema Odeon, Asmara,  1937
 Cinema Roma, Asmara, 1937
 Education Ministry (formerly the Fascist Party Headquarters), Asmara, 1928, 1940
 Farmacia Centrale, Asmara
 Fiat Tagliero Building, Asmara, 1938
 Governor's Palace, Asmara, 1930s
 Lloyd's Building, Asmara, 1938
 Medeber Market, Asmara, 1914
 Municipal Building of Asmara, Asmara, 1951
 National Union of Eritrean Women office (formerly Opera Nazionale Dopolavoro), Asmara, 1939
 Palazzo Berti, Asmara, 1939
 Red Sea Pension, Asmara
 Sanitation Office and Garage of the Central Region, Asmara, 1938
 Sede del Gruppo Rion Fascista (Fascist District Group Head Office), Asmara, 1939
 The Selam Hotel, Asmara, 1937
 Shell Service Station, Asmara, 1937
 World Bank Building, Asmara, 1938

Ghana 
 Rex Theatre, Accra, 1937
 Roxy Theatre, Accra

Guinea-Bissau 
 Cine Bolama, Bolama, Sul Province
 Cine UDIB, Bissau, Guinea-Bissau, 1940s
 Monumento aos Heróis da Independência, Bissau, 1934

Kenya 
 Jubilee Insurance Building, Mombasa
 Mulleys Masaa, Machakos, 1955

Nairobi 
 95 Limuru Road, Nairobi, 1951
 Beneve Coffee House, Nairobi
 City Market, Nairobi
 Kenchic Inn, Nairobi
 Kenwood House, Nairobi, 1936
 Kenya National Theatre, Nairobi, 1951
 Nanak House, Nairobi, 1920s
 Pioneer House Kenyatta Avenue, Nairobi, 1930s
 Shan Cinema, Nairobi
 Simla House, Nairobi
 Sirocco House, Lake Naivasha
 Sirona House, Nairobi
 Skyline Business Institute, Nairobi

Morocco
 Avenida Theater, Tetouan, 1945
 Cathédrale Saint-Pierre de Rabat, Rabat, Morocco, 1919-1930s
 Cinema Avenida, Sidi Ifni
 Cinema Camera, Meknes, 1938
 Cinéma le Colisée, Marrakesh, 1953
 Cinéma Rif, Tangier, 1948
 Cinéma Royal, Rabat
 Cinéma Roxy, Tangier
 Gran Teatro Cervantes, Tangier, 1913
 Guard Tower, El Ouatia, Tan Tan Beach
 Hotel de Ville, Sidi Ifni
 , (and the Museum of Berber History), Marrakesh, 1929
 Ship House, Sidi Ifni
 former Spanish Consulate, Sidi Ifni

Casablanca

 Abderrahman Slaoui Museum, Casablanca, 1940s
 Assayag Building, Casablanca, 1932
 Bank al-Maghrib, Casablanca
 Bar Atomic, Casablanca
 Bendahan Building, Casablanca, 1935
 Le Cabestan, La Corniche, Casablanca, 1927
 Café Champs Elysées, built in the shape of a cruise liner, Casablanca
 Casablanca Cathedral (Église du Sacré-Cœur de Casablanca), Casablanca, 1930
 Central Post Office, Casablanca, 1920
 Cinéma ABC, Casablanca
 Cinéma Atlas, Casablanca
 Cinéma Le Verdun, Casablanca
 Cinéma Lynx, Casablanca, 1950s
 Cinema Rialto, Casablanca, 1930
 Church of the Sacred Heart, Casablanca, 1930
 El Glaoui Building, Casablanca, 1927
 Grande Poste, Casablanca, 1918
 Hotel Colisee, Casablanca
 Hotel Excelsior, Casablanca, 1918
 Hotel Guynemer, Casablanca, 1909
 , Casablanca, 1917
 Hotel Transatlantique, Casablanca, 1922
 Hotel Volubilis, Casablanca, 1920
 IMCAMA Building, Casablanca, 1928
 , Casablanca, 1934
 Imperial Casablanca Hotel & Spa (former Shell Building), Casablanca, 1934
 Lévy-Bendayan Building, Casablanca, 1928
 Marius Boyer house, Casablanca, 1930
 Moses Assayag Building, Casablanca, 1932
 Old Abattoirs (former slaughterhouse), Casablanca, 1912, 1922
 Palais de Justice, Casablanca, 1925
 Villa Suissa, Casablanca, 1947
 La Villa des Arts, Casablanca, 1930s
 Wilaya City Hall administrative building, with Clock Tower, Casablanca, 1927–1936

Fez
 Bank of Morocco, Yacoub el Mansour Square, Fez
Café de la Renaissance, Fez, 1930
 Central Post Office, Fez, 1947
 Cinéma Arc en Ciel, Fez
Cinéma Astor, Fez
 Cinéma Bijou, Fez, 1930
Cinéma Boujloud, Fez
 Cour d'Appel, Fez, 1936
 General Treasury of the Kingdom, Fez, 1935
 Grand Hôtel, Fez, 1929
Raulin Building, Fez, 1930
 Rex Cinema, Fez, 1942

Mozambique

 Central Firefighters' Headquarters, Beira, 1940s
 Cine-Teatro Olympia (now a church), Beira
 Cine-Teatro Tofo, Inhambane
 Damião de Melo House - Verdinho Restaurant, Inhambane, 1940
 Grande Hotel Beira, Beira, 1954
 Hotel Dona Ana, Vilanculos
 Municipal council building, Quelimane
 Nova Zuid LDA shopping center, Nampula
 Post Office (Estação de correios), Tete
 Railway Station, Ressano Garcia
 Train Station, Melema
 Train Station, Ressano Garcia

Maputo 
Maputo, the capital of Mozambique, has a rich Art Deco heritage from the Portuguese colonial period (1781-1976), when the city was called Lourenço Marques.
 Abel da Silva Pascoal building (Lau Cam Soi), Maputo, 1946
 Bharat Samaj Ved Mandir Hindu Temple, Maputo, 1938
 Café Continental, Maputo
 Casa Coimbra, Maputo, 1940
 Casa Rubi, Maputo
 Catedral de Nossa Senhora da Imaculada Conceição (Cathedral of Our Lady of the Immaculate Conception), Maputo, 1944
 Cine Africa, Maputo, 1948
 Cine Gil Vicente, Maputo, 1933
 Cinema Scala, Maputo, 1931
 Clube Ferroviário (The Railway Club), Maputo, 1946
 Edifício Karmali, Maputo, 1930
 Embassy of Portugal, Maputo
 Hotel-Escola Andalucia, Maputo, 1946
 National Organization of Teachers Headquarters, Maputo
 National School of Dance, Maputo
 Rádio de Moçambique (formerly the Rádio Clube de Moçambique), Maputo, 1931
 Portuguese Embassy, Maputo
 Prédio Rubi building, Maputo
 Radio Mozambique Building, Maputo, 1933
 Telecomunicações de Moçambique (Mozambique Telephone building), KaMpfumo district, Maputo

Namibia 
 Villa Margherita, Swakopmund

Nigeria 
 Bower's Tower/Bower Memorial Tower, Ibadan

São Tomé and Príncipe 
 Cineteatro Marcelo da Veiga, Água Grande, São Tomé, 1950

Senegal 
 Embassy of Russia, Dakar
 Hôpital Institut d'Hygiène Social de Dakar, Dakar
 IFAN Museum of African Arts (Musée Théodore Monod d'Art Africain), Dakar, 1938
 Institut Pasteur de Dakar (IPD, Pasteur Institute), Dakar, 1928
 National Office of Veterans Affairs (Office national des Anciens Combattants), Dakar
 Our Lady of Victories Cathedral, Dakar, 1936

Somalia 
 Villa Somalia, Mogadishu, 1922–1936
 Hotel Croce del Sud, Mogadishu, 1938

South Africa 
 Apollo Theatre, Victoria, Karoo, 1920s
Avalon Sweets and Chocolate Center (formerly Avalon Building), Kariega, Eastern Cape
Commercial Building at 1467 Main, Paarl, Western Cape, 1935
 Crown Cork Factory, Isando, Kempton Park, Gauteng, 1951
DaVinci Building, Worcester, Western Cape
Germiston Central Fire Station, Germiston, Gauteng, 1935
Kasteel Motors, Riebeeck Kasteel, Western Cape, 
Kavenda Building (now a furniture store, formerly Selworth's), Nigel, Gauteng
KMV Wine Emporium (Dr André du Toit-Gebou/Building), Paarl, Western Cape
La Rochelle Girls' High School Hostel, Paarl, Western Cape, 1935
La Rochelle Girls' Primary School, Paarl, Western Cape, 1935
Merlyn Court commercial building, Cannon Hill, Kariega, Eastern Cape, 1930s
former Plaza Theatre, Cannon Hill, Kariega, Eastern Cape, 1930s
Prince Albert Liquor Store (formerly petrol station), Prince Albert, Western Cape, 1944
Protea Building (former Protea Cinema), Paarl, Western Cape, 1939
Public Library, Fraserburg, Northern Cape
Quick Lane Upington commercial building, Upington, Northern Cape
 Rand Airport, Germiston, Ekhuruleni, 1920s
The Showroom Theatre, Prince Albert, Western Cape, 
 former Standard Bank, Worcester, Western Cape
Tiger Brands Jam manufacturing building (formerly H. Jones and Co. building), Paarl, additions 1939
Union House, Nigel, Gauteng
Voortrekker Monument, Pretoria, 1949

Cape Town 
Adderey Park parking garage (formerly Geneva House flats), 1935 
Balmoral Flats (formerly Balmoral Hotel), Muizenberg, Cape Town, 1932, 1939 
former Bijou Theater, Observatory, Cape Town, 1940
Botanik Social House (formerly Land and Agricultural Bank of South Africa), City Centre, Cape Town, 1938
Cape Town General Post Office Grand Central, Cape Town
Commercial building (formerly Scott's Building), City Centre, Cape Town, 1932
Dorchester Apartments, Sea Point, Cape Town, 1935
Downtown Lodge Residence, Zonnebloem, Cape Town
Government Motor Transport building at 34 Roeland St., Cape Town, 1940
Holiday Court flats (formerly Hamoaze Court), Simons Town, Cape Town, 1935
Holyrood Apartment Building, City Centre, Cape Town, 1939
Kimberley House, Greenmarket Square, Cape Town
Majestic Mansions, Muizenberg, Cape Town
Market House, Greenmarket Square, Cape Town, 1930
 Mutual Heights Building (formerly SA Mutual life Assurance Society), City Centre, Cape Town, 1940
Namaqua House Apartments, Greenmarket Square, Cape Town, 1933
ONOMO Hotels Cape Town Inn on the Square, Greenmarket Square, Cape Town (formerly Shell House), 1929, 1941
Solent Court flats, Simons Town, Cape Town, 1935
Private Collections furniture store (former Synagogue), Vredehoek, Cape Town
Spar groceries at Cape Quarter Lifestyle Village, Cape Town
former Stakesby-Lewis Hostel, Zonnebloem, Cape Town, 1936
Synagogue, Sea Point, Cape Town,

Durban 
source:
 29 Umbilo Road, Greyville, Durban, 1935
69/71 Beatrice Street, Durban, 1939
 Aboobaker Mansions, Durban, 1937
 Adam's Booksellers, Durban
 Albany Hotel, Durban, 1938
 Alder Court, Durban, 1940
 Althea Court, Durban, 1933
 Ambassador House, Durban, 1930
 Astra Court, Musgrave Road, Durban, 1937
 Bales Court, Durban
 Berea Court, Berea, Durban, 1937
 Broadway Court, Durban, 1933
 Broadwindsor Court, Durban, 1935
 The Cenotaph, Durban, 1926
 Chester House, Durban
 Cheviot Court, Durban 1940s
 Clicks building, Durban
 Colonial Mutual Building, Durban, 1933
 Coral Court, Durban
 Deo Valente, Durban, 1940
 Devonshire Court, Durban
 Dominion Court, Durban
 D'Urban building, Durban
 Ebrahim Court, Durban
 The Edward, (Protea Hotel by Marriott Durban Edward), South Beach, Durban, 1909
 Empire Court, Durban
 , Durban, 1931
 Essop Moosa Building, Durban
 Fallodon, Durban, 2000
 Gloms Court, Durban
 Gleneagles, Durban
 Hattia Trust, Durban
 Heronmere, Durban
 Hertford, Musgrave Road, Durban, 1998
 Himat Court/Avni Court, Durban, 1942
 Hollywood Court, Durban, 1937
 Janora Court, Durban
 Jubilee Court, Morningside, Durban
 Kintyre, Glenwood, Durban
 Lowry's Corner, Musgrave Road, Durban
 Manhattan Court, Durban, 1937
 McIntosh House, Durban, 1935
 Memorial Tower Building (University of KwaZulu-Natal, Howard College Campus), Durban, 1948, 1972
 Metropole Apartments
 Nordbury building, Durban
 Nordic Court, Durban, 1933, 1938
 Pavo Court, Durban, 1940
 Pixley House, Durban, 1938
 Plymouth Hoe, Durban, 1936
 Prefcor House (formerly Payne Brothers Building), Durban
 Quadrant House, Victoria Embankment, Durban
 Sedson's Building, Durban
 St. Aubyn Court, Musgrave Road, Durban, 1940s
 Suncoast Casino, Snell Parade, Berea, Durban, 2003
 Surat Hindoo Association Building, Durban
 Surrey Mansions, Berea, Durban, 1937
 Victoria Mansions, Durban, 1935
Westgard House - Trust Building, Durban, 1939
 Whittington Court, Durban
 Willern Court, Durban, 1937
 Yagashree Mansions, Durban, 1927

Eblawa 
Aldwyn Towers Court, Central Gqeberha, Eastern Cape, 1937
Berkeley Court flats, Summerstrand, Gqeberha, Eastern Cape, 1934, 1990s
Club de Catz (formerly Porter's Ltd), North End, Gqberha, 1933
Court Receife flats, Summerstrand, Gqberha, 1937
Taylor House (housing Epitomy Financial Services), Central, Gqberha, 1935
Hampton Court student accommodation, Central, Gqberha, 1937
Harrodene flats, Summerstrand, Gqberha
Hotel Campanile, Central, Gqberha, 1934
House GL Lippsteu, Redhouse, Gqberha, 1938
Marley Building Systems (formerly Cadbury-Fry factory), Holland Park, Gqberha, 1937
Mastercars offices (formerly Dawson Court flats), North End, Gqberha, 1937
Noninzi Luzipho Building (formerly Colonial Mutual Life Insurance Building - Pleinhuis), Gqberha, 1934
Saraphile Mansions, Central, Gqberha, 1926
Saville House flats, Central, Gqberha, 1935
Shoprite (formerly OK Bazaars), Central, Gqberha, 1937
St Saviour's Anglican Church, Walmer, Gqberha, 1942
Victoria Hotel, Central, Gqberha, 1931
Whitehall Court flats, Central, Gqberha, 1939
YMCA-CVJM, Central Gqeberha, 1936

Johannesburg 
 Anglo American Corporation headquarters, Johannesburg, 1938
Ansteys Building, Johannesburg, 1937
Astor Mansions, Johannesburg, 1932
 Atkinson House, Johannesburg, 1936
 Aventry Court apartments, Johannesburg
Castle Beer Hall (now Ram International Insurance Brokers), Johannesburg, 1939
Daventry Court apartments, Killarney, Johannesburg,  1934
Delta Environmental Centre, Johannesburg, 1934
Duncan House student accommodation (formerly Lintons Hotel), Johannesburg, 1930
 Eskom Building, Johannesburg
Forty Fox Street, Johannesburg
 Gallo House, Johannesburg, 1949
His Majesty's building, Johannesburg
House Naude, 42 8th Avenue, Houghton, Johannesburg, 1936
former Luxor Court, Bertrams, Johannesburg
Manners Mansions, Johannesburg, 1940
Mentone Court retirement home, Killarney, Johannesburg, 1935
Normandie Court apartments, Johannesburg, 1937
Post Office, Jeppen Street, Johannesburg, 1935
Stanhope Mansions, Johannesburg, 1935
Strathearn Mansions, Johannesburg, 1931
Temple Israel, Johannesburg, 1936

Springs, Gauteng 
Carlou Court apartments, Springs, Gauteng, 1933
Central Fire Station, Springs, Gauteng, 1938
Century Cinema (now Magic Motor Spares), Springs, Gauteng, 1939
Josette Towers flats, Springs, Gauteng, 1935
Manitoba House apartments, Springs, Gauteng, 1930
Marie Court flats, Springs, Gauteng, 1936
NUMSA Labor Union headquarters, Springs, Gauteng
Nureef House apartments, Springs, Gauteng, 1935
PAM Brink Rugby Stadium, Springs, Gauteng, 1944
Renesta House, Springs, Gauteng
Southern Building, Springs, Gauteng
Springs Central Business Centre, Springs, Gauteng
Springs Central Fire Station, Springs, Gauteng, 1938
Springs Hotel, Springs, Gauteng, 1932
Wandel Court flats, Springs, Gauteng, 1949

Sudan 
 Acropole Hotel, Khartoum, 1952

Tanzania 
 Cine Afrique (now a supermarket), Zanzibar
 The Diamond Jubilee Building, Dar es Salaam
 The Majestic Theatre, Zanzibar, 1920s, 1955
 Nefaland Hotel, Dar es Salaam
 Palm Beach Hotel, Dar es Salaam, 1950s
 Rupam Stores, Dar es Salaam, 1938-1948

Tunisia 
 , Tunis
 Cinema ABC, Tunis, 1950
 , Tunis
 , Tunis
 , Tunis, 1933f
 , Tunis, 1938
 L'hôtel de Ville, Carthage
 , Tunis
 , Tunis
 , Tunis
 , Tunis
 , Tunis
 , Tunis
 , Tunis
 , Tunis
 , Tunis
 , Tunis
 , Tunis
 , Tunis
 , Tunis
 , Tunis
 Villa Boublil, Tunis

Uganda 
 Fat Cat Backpackers hostel, Kampala
 Kampala Train Station, Kampala
 Madlani Building, 1948
 Norman Cinema (now Watoto Church), Kampala, 1950s
 Odeon – Cinema Hall, Jinja
 Plot 44, Rashid Khamis Road (former petrol station), Kampala, 1930s

Zambia 
 Capitol Theatre, Livingstone
 Stanley House offices, Livingstone, 1931

See also 

 List of Art Deco architecture
 Art Deco topics
 Streamline Moderne architecture

References 

 
Art Deco